Fusinus parvulus is a species of sea snail. It is a marine gastropod mollusc in the family Fasciolariidae, the spindle snails, the tulip snails and their allies.

Description

Distribution
This species occurs in the Mediterranean Sea

References

 Nordsieck, F. (1972). Marine Gastropoden aus der Shiqmona-Bucht in Israël. Archiv für Molluskenkunde der Senckenbergischen Naturforschenden Gesellschaft. 102(4-6): 227-245.
 Buzzurro G. & Russo P. (2007). Fusinus del Mediterraneo. published by the authors, 280 p.

External links
 Monterosato T. A. (di) (1884). Nomenclatura generica e specifica di alcune conchiglie mediterranee. Palermo, Virzi, 152 pp.

parvulus
Gastropods described in 1884